Hashneen Chauhan is an Indian actress and model working in the Punjabi film and music industry. She acted in the movie Lucky Kabootar (2018), DSP Dev (2019) and Tunka Tunka (2021). She also acted in a Webseries named Yaar Jigree Kasooti Degree (2020). Her latest released movie is 'Sab Fadey Jaange'.

References

External links

Indian actresses